Events in the year 1965 in Germany.

Incumbents
President – Heinrich Lübke 
Chancellor – Ludwig Erhard

Events 
 4 January - German broadcaster NDR Fernsehen started.
 27 February - Germany in the Eurovision Song Contest 1965	
 25 June - 6 July - 15th Berlin International Film Festival
 19 September - West German federal election, 1965
 26 October - The Second Erhard cabinet led by Ludwig Erhard was sworn in.

Births 

 January 6 - Christine Wachtel, German runner
 January 12 - Maybrit Illner, German journalist
 January 24 - Robin Dutt, German footballer
 February 9
 Christian Schenk, German athlete
 Dieter Baumann, German athlete
 Silvia Sperber, German sport shooter
 February 24 - Hansi Flick, German football player and manager
 February 27 - Frank Peter Zimmermann, German violinist
 April 6 - Rica Reinisch, German swimmer	
 April 11 - Simone Thomalla, German actress
 April 21
 Thomas Helmer, German football player
 Christina Plate, German actress
 May 11 - Guido Maria Kretschmer, German fashion designer
 May 15 - Martin Sonneborn, German comedian and politician
 May 23 - Tom Tykwer, German film director
 June 10 - Veronica Ferres, German actress	
 June 19 - Sabine Braun, German athlete
 June 23 - Manuel Andrack, German journalist, television show editor, television host and author
 July 9 - Nadine Capellmann, German equestrian	
 August 2 - Katrin Müller-Hohenstein, German journalist
 August 16 - Ercan Durmaz, German actor
 August 28 - Peter Kohl, German businessman and author
 September 7 - Jörg Pilawa, German television presenter
 September 12 
 Silke Hörner, German swimmer
 Oliver Kalkofe, German comedian and television presenter
 October 6 - Jürgen Kohler, German football player
 October 11 - Alexander Hacke, German guitarist and singer
 October 23 - Andreas Zülow, German boxer
 November 7 - Sigrun Wodars, German middle-distance athlete
 November 11 - Friedrich Merz, German lawyer and politician
 November 23 - Marcel Beyer, German writer
 December 3 - Katarina Witt, German figure skater
 December 4 - Ulf Kirsten, German football player
 December 21
 Anke Engelke, German actress and comedian
 Cem Özdemir, German politician

Full date unknown 
 Henning Löhlein, German illustrator

Deaths

 17 January - Hans Marchwitza, German writer and poet (born 1890)
 29 March - Heinrich Schomburgk, German tennis player (born 1885)
 7 May - Princess Pauline of Württemberg (born 1877)
 12 May - Max Herz, German businessman (born 1905)
 1 June - Hellmut von der Chevallerie, German general (born 1896)
 2 September - Johannes Bobrowski, German poet and writer (born 1917)
 4 September — Albert Schweitzer, German theologian, organist, philosopher, and physician (born 1875)
 8 September — Hermann Staudinger, German chemist (born 1881)
 11 October - Hans Nielsen, German actor (born 1911)	
 22 October - Paul Tillich, Christian existentialist philosopher and Lutheran Protestant theologian  (born 1886)
 25 October - Hans Knappertsbusch, German conductor (born 1888)
 2 November - Herbert Windt, German composer (born 1894)
 3 November - Hans von Raumer, German politician (born 1870)	
 19 November — Werner Lange, Kriegsmarine admiral (born 1893)

See also
 1965 in German television

References

 
Years of the 20th century in Germany
1960s in Germany
Germany
Germany